The Syncephalastraceae are a family of fungi in the order Mucorales. Members of this family have a widespread distribution, but are more common in tropical and subtropical regions.

Description

The family is characterized by the presence of merosporangia. Zygospores are warty, and borne on opposed suspensors.

References

External links
 
 Index Fungorum

Zygomycota
Fungus families